Army of Me: Remixes and Covers was released in May 2005.  It is a collection of seventeen eclectic remixes of Björk's song "Army of Me" from Post, her 1995 album.  Army of Me: Remixes and Covers was organised by Björk in response to a devastating Asian tsunami.  Putting out a call on her website, Björk reached thousands of musicians around the globe, asking for a remix of "Army of Me" and stating that all the proceeds would go to the United Nations Children's Fund emergency work with children around the world.  Björk received six hundred different remixes of the song before settling on the final twenty versions which made the album. It peaked at number fourteen on the dance albums chart in the UK and at number 168 in the France album charts.

As of January 2006, the album had raised around £250,000 to help UNICEF's work in the south east Asian region.

Track listing

Charts

References

External links 
 Army of Me: Remixes and Covers mini site

Björk remix albums
2005 remix albums
One Little Independent Records remix albums